What Would You Do? (commonly abbreviated as WWYD, and formerly known as Primetime: What Would You Do? through the program's fifth season) is an American situational hidden camera television series that has been broadcast on the American Broadcasting Company (ABC) since February 26, 2008. Created by Chris Whipple, the show with a social experiment format follows the reactions of passing strangers as they encounter conflict or illegal activity in a public setting, unaware that it is all staged and being recorded with hidden cameras. Throughout all of its sixteen seasons, the show has been hosted by news correspondent John Quiñones.

Appearing periodically on ABC's Primetime from 2005 to 2007, What Would You Do? became an instant success for the ABC network. Following the 2007 writers' strike, ABC ordered the first season of the show. The series was annually renewed for a second, third, fourth, and fifth season. Starting with the sixth season, the show began to feature guest appearances, which included Barbara Corcoran, Howie Mandel, and Meredith Vieira. Following the seventh season, What Would You Do? aired its first Christmas special in its eighth season. This was followed by guest appearances by Daymond John and Pnina Tornai in the show's ninth season, Winnie Harlow in the show's tenth season, and an era without guests in the show's eleventh and twelfth seasons. A 10-year anniversary special was aired in 2017 as the season finale of the thirteenth season, titled "What Would You Do?: Then and Now", featuring scenarios originally aired on Primetime and in season one being remade with the same actors in the same locations. Following the fourteenth and fifteenth seasons of the show, ABC announced that they would air episodes filmed before the COVID-19 pandemic as part of the show's sixteenth season, as well as a special hosted by Gio Benitez as part of the sixteenth season's season finale.

History

What Would You Do? was conceived as a format-based series for ABC's newsmagazine Primetime, however, all on-air references to the parent program were removed from What Would You Do? following the discontinuation of Primetime as a standalone program by the network in 2010, with subject-based formats of the program, such as Primetime: Family Secrets, airing thereafter during the summer months or as a temporary replacement for entertainment programs canceled during the fall-to-spring television season.

The program features actors acting out scenes of conflict or illegal activity in public settings while hidden cameras record the scene, and the focus is on whether or not bystanders intervene, and how. Variations are usually included, such as changing the genders, the races, or the clothing of the actors performing the scene, to see if bystanders react differently. The situations often pertain to prejudice; race, sex, religious beliefs, physical and mental disabilities, obesity and weight, sexual harassment, vandalism, theft, physical appearance, homelessness, financial trouble, parenting, and social status are common themes. Quiñones appears at the end of each scenario to interview bystanders and witnesses about their reactions.

During some of the segments, psychology professors, teachers, or club members watch and discuss the recorded video with Quiñones, explaining and making inferences on the bystanders' reactions. This and similar formats have been criticized for their design, leading to conclusions about the bystanders that fail to account for other possible explanations for their behavior.

In 2013, a short-lived spinoff titled Would You Fall for That? was aired, with 3 episodes. Filmed entirely in the state of New York, the show presented a study on human behavior based on hidden camera social experiments performed on complete strangers.

Episodes

Series overview

Season 1 (2008)

Season 2 (2009)

Season 3 (2010)

Season 4 (2010–2011)

Season 5 (2012)

Season 6 (2012)

Season 7 (2013)

Season 8 (2013)

Season 9 (2014)

Season 10 (2015)

Season 11 (2016)

Season 12 (2016)

Season 13 (2017)

Season 14 (2018)

Season 15 (2019)

Season 16 (2020)

Ratings

Season 1

Season 2

Season 3

Season 4

Season 5

Season 6

Season 7

Season 8

Season 9

Season 10

Season 11

Season 12

Season 13

 Live +7 ratings were not available, so Live +3 ratings have been used instead.

Season 14

Season 15

Season 16

Syndication
Reruns of older What Would You Do? episodes began airing on the Oprah Winfrey Network (OWN) on February 15, 2011, under the title What Would You Do?: OWN Edition. Reruns of the program began airing on HLN in 2012 as part of the cable news channel's primetime schedule. In the United States, the show has been broadcast on A&E since 2015.

Notes

References

External links
 
 

 
2000s American reality television series
2010s American reality television series
2008 American television series debuts
2020 American television series endings
ABC News
American Broadcasting Company original programming
American hidden camera television series
2000s American television news shows
2010s American television news shows
English-language television shows
Hidden camera television series
Television shows filmed in the United States